Illinois is the 11th-wealthiest of the 50 United States, with a per capita income of $23,104 according to the 2000 census.

Illinois counties ranked by per capita income

Note: Data is from the 2010 United States Census Data and the 2006-2010 American Community Survey 5-Year Estimates.

Illinois places ranked by per capita income 2007-2017
 Winnetka – $98,139
 Kenilworth – $97,381
 Glencoe – $94,900
 Inverness – $91,623
 Barrington Hills – $91,555
 Lake Forest – $86,004
 Oak Brook – $81,213
 North Barrington – $78,326
 South Barrington – $75,185
 Highland Park – $68,688
 Riverwoods – $67,878
 Wilmette – $67,116
 Lincolnshire – $67,084
 Northfield – $65,638
 Hinsdale – $63,765
 Lake Barrington – $63,158
 Long Grove – $62,185
 Deer Park – $61,429
 Burr Ridge – $58,518	
 Trout Valley – $58,013
 Medinah, Illinois – $56,950
 Wayne, Illinois – $54,990
 Lake Bluff, Illinois – $54,824
 Bull Valley, Illinois – $54,022
 Golf – $52,859
 Glenview – $52,326
 Tower Lakes, Illinois – $52,025
 Kildeer, Illinois – $51,973
 Leland Grove, Illinois – $51,714
 Green Oaks, Illinois – $51,066
 Northbrook, Illinois – $50,765
 Deerfield, Illinois – $50,664
 Buffalo Grove, Illinois – $49,696
 Hawthorn Woods, Illinois – $49,346
 Olympia Fields, Illinois – $46,698
 Hanaford, Illinois – $46,500
 River Forest, Illinois – $46,123
 Lakewood, Illinois – $44,579
 Oakbrook Terrace, Illinois – $44,345
 Naperville, Illinois – $44,235
 Barrington, Illinois – $43,942
 Western Springs, Illinois – $43,699
 Glenview, Illinois  – $43,384
 Libertyville, Illinois – $43,279
 Old Mill Creek, Illinois – $43,314
 Flossmoor, Illinois – $42,820
 Clarendon Hills, Illinois – $41,859
 Port Barrington, Illinois – $41,284
 Indian Head Park, Illinois – $40,094
 Palos Park, Illinois – $39,861
 Darien, Illinois – $39,795
 Glen Ellyn, Illinois – $39,783
 Topeka, Illinois – $39,651
 Bannockburn, Illinois – $39,303
 Willowbrook, Illinois – $37,715
 Oak Park, Illinois – $36,340
 Prairie Grove, Illinois – $36,234
 Park Ridge, Illinois – $36,046
 Lincolnwood, Illinois – $35,911
 Seaton, Illinois – $35,832
 Lisle, Illinois – $35,693
 Winfield, Illinois – $35,482
 Wadsworth, Illinois – $35,171
 Third Lake, Illinois – $34,921
 La Grange, Illinois – $34,887
 Riverside, Illinois – $34,712
 Wheaton, Illinois – $34,147
 Itasca, Illinois – $34,117
 Forsyth, Illinois – $34,010
 St. Charles, Illinois – $33,969
 Frankfort, Illinois – $33,968
 Evanston, Illinois – $33,645
 Arlington Heights, Illinois – $33,544
 Indian Creek, Illinois – $33,515
 Willowbrook, Illinois – $33,177
 Geneva, Illinois – $33,026
 Palos Heights, Illinois – $32,895
 Vernon Hills, Illinois – $32,246
 Elmhurst, Illinois – $32,015
 Gilberts, Illinois – $31,898
 East Dundee, Illinois – $31,695
 Downers Grove, Illinois – $31,580
 Timberlane, Illinois – $31,529
 Gurnee, Illinois – $31,517
 Homer Glen, Illinois – $31,472
 Sleepy Hollow, Illinois – $31,005
 Bloomingdale, Illinois – $30,941
 Grandwood Park, Illinois – $30,912
 West Dundee, Illinois – $30,674
 Palatine, Illinois – $30,661
 Schaumburg, Illinois – $30,587
 Orland Park, Illinois – $30,467
 Willow Springs, Illinois – $30,394
 Sugar Grove, Illinois – $30,299
 Lake Zurich, Illinois – $30,287
 La Grange Park, Illinois – $30,247
 Algonquin, Illinois – $29,820
 Crete, Illinois – $29,671
 Bartlett, Illinois – $29,652
 Westchester, Illinois – $29,634
 Lily Lake, Illinois – $29,611
 Warrenville, Illinois – $28,922
 Grayslake, Illinois – $28,898
 Fox River Grove, Illinois – $28,870
 Forest Lake, Illinois – $28,737
 Elk Grove Village, Illinois – $28,515
 Roselle, Illinois – $28,501
 Gages Lake, Illinois – $28,391
 Lemont, Illinois – $28,354
 Plainfield, Illinois – $28,242
 Prospect Heights, Illinois – $28,200
 Shorewood, Illinois – $28,199
 Elvaston, Illinois – $27,947
 Woodridge, Illinois – $27,851
 Batavia, Illinois – $27,783
 Channel Lake, Illinois – $27,772
 Monee, Illinois – $27,687
 Lombard, Illinois – $27,667
 Maryville, Illinois – $27,634
 Johnsburg, Illinois – $27,582
 Lindenhurst, Illinois – $27,534
 Sherman, Illinois – $27,491
 Huntley, Illinois – $27,451
 Germantown Hills, Illinois – $27,350
 Fox Lake Hills, Illinois – $27,343
 Oswego, Illinois – $27,204
 Lake Summerset, Illinois – $27,160
 Ringwood, Illinois – $27,137
 Skokie, Illinois – $27,136
 Morton Grove, Illinois – $26,973
 Cary, Illinois – $26,903
 Rochester, Illinois – $26,881
 Virgil, Illinois – $26,881
 Elburn, Illinois – $26,781
 Columbia, Illinois – $26,767
 Mokena, Illinois – $26,737
 Hoffman Estates, Illinois – $26,669
 Morton, Illinois – $26,531
 Edwardsville, Illinois – $26,510
 Mount Prospect, Illinois – $26,464
 Oakwood Hills, Illinois – $26,397
 Westmont, Illinois – $26,394
 Glen Carbon, Illinois – $26,374
 Wauconda, Illinois – $26,355
 Mundelein, Illinois – $26,280
 Lake in the Hills, Illinois – $26,239
 Lake Villa, Illinois – $26,238
 Seatonville, Illinois – $26,197
 Rolling Meadows, Illinois – $26,178
 Crystal Lake, Illinois – $26,146
 Bishop Hill, Illinois – $26,145
 Homewood, Illinois – $26,074
 Minooka, Illinois – $26,054
 Forest Park, Illinois – $26,045
 Savoy, Illinois – $25,949
 Antioch, Illinois – $25,711
 South Elgin, Illinois – $25,676
 Swansea, Illinois – $25,634
 North Aurora, Illinois – $25,552
 Shiloh, Illinois – $25,550
 Wood Dale, Illinois – $25,507
 Spring Grove, Illinois – $25,506
 Countryside, Illinois – $25,449
 Burlington, Illinois – $25,349
 Palos Hills, Illinois – $25,331
 Roscoe, Illinois – $25,324
 Godfrey, Illinois – $25,292
 Tinley Park, Illinois – $25,207
 New Lenox, Illinois – $25,161
 Carol Stream, Illinois – $25,152
 Hopewell, Illinois – $25,143
 Matteson, Illinois – $25,024
 McCook, Illinois – $24,996
 Wheeling, Illinois – $24,989
 South Holland, Illinois – $24,977
 Lockport, Illinois – $24,939
 O'Fallon, Illinois – $24,821
 Bloomington, Illinois – $24,751
 Yorkville, Illinois – $24,514
 Rapids City, Illinois – $24,499
 Roanoke, Illinois – $24,489
 Port Byron, Illinois – $24,363
 Wilmington, Illinois – $24,357
 Glenwood, Illinois – $24,356
 Fox Lake, Illinois – $24,350
 Berkeley, Illinois – $24,334
 Brookfield, Illinois – $24,307
 Panola, Illinois – $24,259
 Winthrop Harbor, Illinois – $24,256
 Washington, Illinois – $24,231
 Island Lake, Illinois – $24,206
 Des Plaines, Illinois – $24,146
 Highwood, Illinois – $24,138
 Rockton, Illinois – $24,078
 North Riverside, Illinois – $24,034
 Hennepin, Illinois – $23,981
 Streamwood, Illinois – $23,961
 Oak Lawn, Illinois – $23,877
 Beach Park, Illinois – $23,803
 Hickory Hills, Illinois – $23,747
 Cherry Valley, Illinois – $23,725
 Coal City, Illinois – $23,662
 Niles, Illinois – $23,543
 Venetian Village, Illinois – $23,504
 Hinckley, Illinois – $23,491
 Oak Forest, Illinois – $23,487
 Bolingbrook, Illinois – $23,468
 Beecher, Illinois – $23,454
 Norridge, Illinois – $23,431
 Peotone, Illinois – $23,415
 Lake Catherine, Illinois – $23,401
 Pingree Grove, Illinois – $23,396
 Montgomery, Illinois – $23,395
 Jerome, Illinois – $23,350
 Springfield, Illinois – $23,324
 McHenry, Illinois – $23,272
 Monticello, Illinois – $23,257
 Woodstock, Illinois – $23,210
 Chatham, Illinois – $23,167
 Long Creek, Illinois – $23,141
 Sycamore, Illinois – $23,112
 North Utica, Illinois – $23,061
 Evergreen Park, Illinois – $23,038
 Mineral, Illinois – $23,017
 Sublette, Illinois – $22,982
 New Millford, Illinois – $22,937
 Thornton, Illinois – $22,899
 Bedford Park, Illinois – $22,887
 Channahon, Illinois – $22,867
 Standard City, Illinois – $22,852
 Manteno, Illinois – $22,826
 Volo, Illinois – $22,791
 Mount Zion, Illinois – $22,784
 Mapleton, Illinois – $22,728
 Lynwood, Illinois – $22,650
 Secor, Illinois – $22,635
 Richton Park, Illinois – $22,626
 Fairview Heights, Illinois – $22,614
 Harwood Heights, Illinois – $22,558
 Lansing, Illinois – $22,547
 Elmwood Park, Illinois – $22,526
 Lakemoor, Illinois – $22,499
 Merrionette Park, Illinois – $22,497
 Hampton, Illinois – $22,492
 Tonica, Illinois – $22,484
 Bourbonnais, Illinois – $22,476
 Downs, Illinois – $22,468
 Elwood, Illinois – $22,442
 Grant Park, Illinois – $22,403
 Villa Park, Illinois – $22,354
 Richmond, Illinois – $22,332
 Crest Hill, Illinois – $22,317
 Morris, Illinois – $22,256
 Hainesville, Illinois – $22,250
 West Peoria, Illinois – $22,247
 Carbon Hill, Illinois – $22,228
 Marengo, Illinois – $22,225
 Donovan, Illinois – $22,215
 Chester, Illinois – $22,190
 Broadview, Illinois – $22,178
 Hampshire, Illinois – $22,143
 Hudson, Illinois – $22,141
 Aurora, Illinois – $22,131
 Chillicothe, Illinois – $22,118
 Newark, Illinois – $22,078
 Collinsville, Illinois – $22,048
 Gifford, Illinois – $22,040
 Frankfort Square, Illinois – $22,038
 Royal, Illinois – $22,019
 Crestwood, Illinois – $21,995
 Mahomet, Illinois – $21,990
 Grafton, Illinois – $21,989
 Nashville, Illinois – $21,935
 Maple Park, Illinois – $21,932
 Millstadt, Illinois – $21,914
 Glendale Heights, Illinois – $21,911
 Coalton, Illinois – $21,901
 Mazon, Illinois – $21,890
 Tremont, Illinois – $21,888
 Pistakee Highlands, Illinois – $21,852
 Germantown, Illinois – $21,851
 Reynolds, Illinois – $21,804
 Hillsdale, Illinois – $21,772
 El Paso, Illinois – $21,730
 Ladd, Illinois – $21,696
 Manhattan, Illinois – $21,666
 Hillside, Illinois – $21,638
 Panama, Illinois – $21,634
 Cantrall, Illinois – $21,610
 Pawnee, Illinois – $21,599
 Round Lake, Illinois – $21,585
 Mascoutah, Illinois – $21,569
 Country Club Hills, Illinois – $21,561
 Moline, Illinois – $21,557
 Boulder Hill, Illinois – $21,536
 East Galesburg, Illinois – $21,532
 Philo, Illinois – $21,502
 Park Forest, Illinois – $21,493
 East Brooklyn, Illinois – $21,470
 Lisbon, Illinois – $21,456
 Cordova, Illinois – $21,442
 Kingston, Illinois – $21,432
 Wonder Lake, Illinois – $21,428
 Sidney, Illinois – $21,425
 Orland Hills, Illinois – $21,415
 Trenton, Illinois – $21,393
 St. Joseph, Illinois – $21,381
 Forest View, Illinois – $21,376
 Union Hill, Illinois – $21,371
 Wonder Lake, Illinois – $21,352
 Sibley, Illinois – $21,317
 Oakford, Illinois – $21,309
 Teutopolis, Illinois – $21,280
 Buckley, Illinois – $21,251
 Romeoville, Illinois – $21,221
 Union, Illinois – $21,218
 Reddick, Illinois – $21,207
 Addison, Illinois – $21,201
 Ashton, Illinois – $21,200
 Pesotum, Illinois – $21,191
 Phillipstown, Illinois – $21,188
 Troy, Illinois – $21,174
 Spaulding, Illinois – $21,168
 Elgin, Illinois – $21,112
 Shannon, Illinois – $21,108
 Highland, Illinois – $21,101
 Waterloo, Illinois – $21,081
 Greenview, Illinois – $21,050
 Orion, Illinois – $21,043
 Stillman Valley, Illinois – $21,036
 Long Lake, Illinois – $21,034
 Winnebago, Illinois – $21,019
 Peoria Heights, Illinois – $20,999
 Coal Valley, Illinois – $20,996
 East Dubuque, Illinois – $20,984
 South Jacksonville, Illinois – $20,973
 Brocton, Illinois – $20,960
 Mansfield, Illinois – $20,947
 Makanda, Illinois – $20,937
 Thayer, Illinois – $20,933
 Dwight, Illinois – $20,928
 Rock City, Illinois – $20,920
 Lexington, Illinois – $20,898
 Holiday Hills, Illinois – $20,883
 Weldon, Illinois – $20,851
 Malta, Illinois – $20,839
 Ashkum, Illinois – $20,806
 Congerville, Illinois – $20,795
 Loves Park, Illinois – $20,781
 Le Roy, Illinois – $20,743
 Justice, Illinois – $20,714
 Hanna City, Illinois – $20,710
 Riverton, Illinois – $20,678
 Peru, Illinois – $20,658
 Heyworth, Illinois – $20,655
 Princeton, Illinois – $20,632
 East Gillespie, Illinois – $20,628
 Andalusia, Illinois – $20,626
 Clifton, Illinois – $20,618
 Bartonville, Illinois – $20,580
 Braidwood, Illinois – $20,545
 Breese, Illinois – $20,530
 Rosewood Heights, Illinois – $20,527
 Peoria, Illinois – $20,512
 Roxana, Illinois – $20,511
 Alsip, Illinois – $20,498
 Poplar Grove, Illinois – $20,493
 Atlanta, Illinois – $20,460
 Eureka, Illinois – $20,460
 Pecatonica, Illinois – $20,420
 Valmeyer, Illinois – $20,420
 Dunlap, Illinois – $20,407
 Aviston, Illinois – $20,395
 River Grove, Illinois – $20,390
 Perry, Illinois – $20,383
 McNabb, Illinois – $20,374
 Crystal Lawns, Illinois – $20,369
 McCullom Lake, Illinois – $20,350
 St. Jacob, Illinois – $20,340
 Mount Morris, Illinois – $20,326
 Adeline, Illinois – $20,301
 Chicago Ridge, Illinois – $20,278
 Toluca, Illinois – $20,243
 Shabbona, Illinois – $20,239
 Carlock, Illinois – $20,227
 Diamond, Illinois – $20,223
 Dalzell, Illinois – $20,215
 Williamsville, Illinois – $20,201
 Metamora, Illinois – $20,200
 Evansville, Illinois – $20,194
 Morrison, Illinois – $20,179
 Jerseyville, Illinois – $20,178
 Chicago, Illinois – $20,175
 Foosland, Illinois – $20,173
 Lyons, Illinois – $20,172
 Midlothian, Illinois – $20,150
 Media, Illinois – $20,149
 East Peoria, Illinois – $20,147
 Oreana, Illinois – $20,133
 Walnut, Illinois – $20,126
 Geneseo, Illinois – $20,115
 Goodfield, Illinois – $20,099
 Ashland, Illinois – $20,090
 Cedarville, Illinois – $20,076
 Granville, Illinois – $20,074
 Bensenville, Illinois – $20,040
 Blue Mound, Illinois – $20,039
 St. Libory, Illinois – $20,024
 University Park, Illinois – $20,017
 Kinsman, Illinois – $20,011
 Cleveland, Illinois – $19,990
 Red Bud, Illinois – $19,967
 Hanover Park, Illinois – $19,960
 Elkhart, Illinois – $19,958
 Farmer City, Illinois – $19,946
 Lake of the Woods, Illinois – $19,938
 Broadwell, Illinois – $19,911
 Hazel Crest, Illinois – $19,908
 Hoffman, Illinois – $19,897
 Tolono, Illinois – $19,894
 Wenonah, Illinois – $19,890
 Fithian, Illinois – $19,856
 Freeburg, Illinois – $19,851
 Marshall, Illinois – $19,851
 Neponset, Illinois – $19,846
 Fulton, Illinois – $19,845
 Buckingham, Illinois – $19,816
 Steger, Illinois – $19,816
 Windsor, Illinois (Mercer County) – $19,811
 Elmwood, Illinois – $19,797
 Rockford, Illinois – $19,781
 Rosemont, Illinois – $19,781
 Galena, Illinois – $19,773
 Flanagan, Illinois – $19,767
 Gridley, Illinois – $19,752
 Arenzville, Illinois – $19,730
 Lee, Illinois – $19,709
 Smithton, Illinois – $19,695
 Dawson, Illinois – $19,686
 Machesney Park, Illinois – $19,685
 Arthur, Illinois – $19,683
 Ogden, Illinois – $19,679
 Buffalo, Illinois – $19,637
 Pekin, Illinois – $19,616
 Warren, Illinois – $19,611
 Danvers, Illinois – $19,598
 Lerna, Illinois – $19,596
 Prophetstown, Illinois – $19,572
 Chenoa, Illinois – $19,559
 Sandwich, Illinois – $19,530
 Belle Prairie City, Illinois – $19,528
 Ludlow, Illinois – $19,507
 Minier, Illinois – $19,478
 Okawville, Illinois – $19,476
 Illiopolis, Illinois – $19,473
 Spring Valley, Illinois – $19,467
 Leonore, Illinois – $19,465
 Tuscola, Illinois – $19,465
 Worth, Illinois – $19,449
 Niantic, Illinois – $19,448
 Sterling, Illinois – $19,432
 Ottawa, Illinois – $19,426
 Bellwood, Illinois – $19,420
 Piper City, Illinois – $19,393
 Meredosia, Illinois – $19,391
 Joliet, Illinois – $19,390
 Benson, Illinois – $19,358
 New Salem, Illinois – $19,351
 Farmington, Illinois – $19,336
 Sauget, Illinois – $19,330
 Cherry, Illinois – $19,313
 Hammond, Illinois – $19,313
 New Berlin, Illinois – $19,313
 Chebanse, Illinois – $19,290
 West Chicago, Illinois – $19,287
 Mackinaw, Illinois – $19,279
 Seneca, Illinois – $19,273
 New Baden, Illinois – $19,268
 Pearl City, Illinois – $19,256
 New Holland, Illinois – $19,241
 Genoa, Illinois – $19,239
 Milledgeville, Illinois – $19,220
 Greenwood, Illinois – $19,216
 Durand, Illinois – $19,211
 Rock Island, Illinois – $19,202
 McLean, Illinois – $19,200
 Catlin, Illinois – $19,164
 Hometown, Illinois – $19,149
 Fairbury, Illinois – $19,145
 Princeville, Illinois – $19,137
 Caledonia, Illinois – $19,134
 Effingham, Illinois – $19,132
 Gays, Illinois – $19,131
 Steeleville, Illinois – $19,124
 Berwyn, Illinois – $19,113
 Somonauk, Illinois – $19,110
 Stickney, Illinois – $19,109
 La Salle, Illinois – $19,099
 Coyne Center, Illinois – $19,093
 Milford, Illinois – $19,078
 South Wilmington, Illinois – $19,078
 Marion, Illinois – $19,073
 Hamel, Illinois – $19,062
 Gillespie, Illinois – $19,042
 Warrensburg, Illinois – $19,041
 Bradley, Illinois – $19,035
 Irwin, Illinois – $19,027
 Oregon, Illinois – $19,019
 Albers, Illinois – $19,017
 Decatur, Illinois – $19,009
 Campus, Illinois – $19,005
 Gardner, Illinois – $18,995
 Belleville, Illinois – $18,990
 Cedar Point, Illinois – $18,988
 Damiansville, Illinois – $18,985
 Henning, Illinois – $18,974
 Exeter, Illinois – $18,968
 Sherrard, Illinois – $18,967
 Creston, Illinois – $18,927
 Gibson City, Illinois – $18,926
 Burbank, Illinois – $18,923
 Spring Bay, Illinois – $18,915
 Mark, Illinois – $18,912
 Carterville, Illinois – $18,884
 Loda, Illinois – $18,877
 Ohio, Illinois – $18,858
 Kirkland, Illinois – $18,841
 Waterman, Illinois – $18,836
 Hebron, Illinois – $18,829
 Ivesdale, Illinois – $18,829
 Mount Auburn, Illinois – $18,829
 Bridgeview, Illinois – $18,802
 Homer, Illinois – $18,788
 Lostant, Illinois – $18,782
 Albany, Illinois – $18,780
 Cortland, Illinois – $18,775
 Erie, Illinois – $18,775
 Hamilton, Illinois – $18,775
 Carlyle, Illinois – $18,744
 Rockdale, Illinois – $18,738
 Woodhull, Illinois – $18,738
 Delavan, Illinois – $18,734
 Clinton, Illinois – $18,729
 Petersburg, Illinois – $18,718
 Pleasant Plains, Illinois – $18,714
 Towanda, Illinois – $18,702
 Bethalto, Illinois – $18,697
 Harristown, Illinois – $18,689
 Stanford, Illinois – $18,687
 Essex, Illinois – $18,686
 Preston Heights, Illinois – $18,681
 Freeport, Illinois – $18,680
 Fairview, Illinois – $18,677
 Oglesby, Illinois – $18,674
 Spillertown, Illinois – $18,674
 Divernon, Illinois – $18,670
 Arcola, Illinois – $18,664
 Champaign, Illinois – $18,664
 Cornell, Illinois – $18,655
 Oakwood, Illinois – $18,655
 Oakdale, Illinois – $18,651
 Knoxville, Illinois – $18,643
 Southern View, Illinois – $18,633
 Ingalls Park, Illinois – $18,628
 Paxton, Illinois – $18,617
 Mount Pulaski, Illinois – $18,616
 Lena, Illinois – $18,613
 Eagarville, Illinois – $18,605
 Polo, Illinois – $18,604
 Davis, Illinois – $18,595
 Park City, Illinois – $18,595
 German Valley, Illinois – $18,564
 Chesterfield, Illinois – $18,555
 Kenney, Illinois – $18,553
 De Witt, Illinois – $18,552
 Sadorus, Illinois – $18,540
 Odell, Illinois – $18,538
 Bonfield, Illinois – $18,531
 Herscher, Illinois – $18,522
 Dupo, Illinois – $18,505
 Aledo, Illinois – $18,498
 East Hazel Crest, Illinois – $18,488
 Worden, Illinois – $18,485
 Henry, Illinois – $18,473
 Dakota, Illinois – $18,440
 Andover, Illinois – $18,439
 Ellsworth, Illinois – $18,439
 Hecker, Illinois – $18,423
 Lakewood Shores, Illinois – $18,414
 Mason City, Illinois – $18,411
 Camargo, Illinois – $18,369
 Auburn, Illinois – $18,368
 South Beloit, Illinois – $18,363
 Manito, Illinois – $18,345
 Rome, Illinois – $18,345
 Morrisonville, Illinois – $18,324
 Lacon, Illinois – $18,309
 Maroa, Illinois – $18,308
 Grand Ridge, Illinois – $18,287
 Cissna Park, Illinois – $18,285
 Calumet Park, Illinois – $18,283
 Round Lake Park, Illinois – $18,279
 Warsaw, Illinois – $18,279
 Carthage, Illinois – $18,269
 Apple River, Illinois – $18,267
 Fisher, Illinois – $18,262
 East Moline, Illinois – $18,245
 Edinburg, Illinois – $18,243
 Raymond, Illinois – $18,231
 Waverly, Illinois – $18,205
 Elliott, Illinois – $18,203
 Yale, Illinois – $18,199
 Pierron, Illinois – $18,196
 Moweaqua, Illinois – $18,195
 Mattoon, Illinois – $18,186
 Amboy, Illinois – $18,183
 Greenup, Illinois – $18,179
 South Chicago Heights, Illinois – $18,179
 Taylorville, Illinois – $18,162
 Argenta, Illinois – $18,154
 Nauvoo, Illinois – $18,150
 Thawville, Illinois – $18,149
 Rochelle, Illinois – $18,139
 Marine, Illinois – $18,133
 Viola, Illinois – $18,127
 Calumet City, Illinois – $18,123
 Northlake, Illinois – $18,119
 Round Lake Beach, Illinois – $18,113
 San Jose, Illinois – $18,110
 Browning, Illinois – $18,109
 Dolton, Illinois – $18,102
 Wood River, Illinois – $18,098
 Barry, Illinois – $18,097
 North Pekin, Illinois – $18,072
 Venedy, Illinois – $18,061
 Yates City, Illinois – $18,036
 Macon, Illinois – $18,029
 Atwood, Illinois – $18,028
 Bement, Illinois – $17,995
 Coulterville, Illinois – $17,994
 Colfax, Illinois – $17,993
 Athens, Illinois – $17,981
 Virginia, Illinois – $17,979
 Newman, Illinois – $17,971
 Wenona, Illinois – $17,951
 Rantoul, Illinois – $17,948
 New Minden, Illinois – $17,942
 Williamsfield, Illinois – $17,941
 Marquette Heights, Illinois – $17,935
 Roberts, Illinois – $17,926
 Hodgkins, Illinois – $17,920
 Crainville, Illinois – $17,911
 Table Grove, Illinois – $17,877
 Round Lake Heights, Illinois – $17,868
 Armington, Illinois – $17,866
 Thomasboro, Illinois – $17,866
 Symerton, Illinois – $17,863
 Cambridge, Illinois – $17,842
 Plano, Illinois – $17,837
 Momence, Illinois – $17,836
 Shawneetown, Illinois – $17,834
 Green Valley, Illinois – $17,830
 Aroma Park, Illinois – $17,806
 Belvidere, Illinois – $17,804
 Marseilles, Illinois – $17,793
 Hopedale, Illinois – $17,784
 Schiller Park, Illinois – $17,781
 Normal, Illinois – $17,775
 Danforth, Illinois – $17,754
 Dorchester, Illinois – $17,753
 Paris, Illinois – $17,750
 Atkinson, Illinois – $17,732
 Mendota, Illinois – $17,731
 Zion, Illinois – $17,730
 Stockton, Illinois – $17,728
 Sheffield, Illinois – $17,723
 Cisco, Illinois – $17,722
 Forrest, Illinois – $17,707
 Huey, Illinois – $17,695
 Sullivan, Illinois – $17,693
 Granite City, Illinois – $17,691
 Minonk, Illinois – $17,688
 Loami, Illinois – $17,661
 Anchor, Illinois – $17,642
 New Athens, Illinois – $17,627
 Tiskilwa, Illinois – $17,625
 Capron, Illinois – $17,624
 Washburn, Illinois – $17,619
 Palmer, Illinois – $17,615
 Milan, Illinois – $17,608
 Nora, Illinois – $17,608
 Shelbyville, Illinois – $17,596
 Braceville, Illinois – $17,586
 Deer Creek, Illinois – $17,578
 Elizabethtown, Illinois – $17,567
 Franklin Park, Illinois – $17,550
 Westville, Illinois – $17,538
 Hanover, Illinois – $17,535
 Ransom, Illinois – $17,524
 Lanark, Illinois – $17,518
 Allerton, Illinois – $17,512
 Rose Hill, Illinois – $17,510
 Grandview, Illinois – $17,499
 Jacksonville, Illinois – $17,482
 La Rose, Illinois – $17,480
 Quincy, Illinois – $17,479
 Hardin, Illinois – $17,461
 Paw Paw, Illinois – $17,461
 Hillsboro, Illinois – $17,458
 Standard, Illinois – $17,453
 Kappa, Illinois – $17,451
 Bondville, Illinois – $17,439
 Coleta, Illinois – $17,439
 Orangeville, Illinois – $17,437
 Carpentersville, Illinois – $17,424
 Grantfork, Illinois – $17,415
 Mound Station, Illinois – $17,413
 Alpha, Illinois – $17,407
 Gilman, Illinois – $17,396
 Wapella, Illinois – $17,395
 De Land, Illinois – $17,377
 Waukegan, Illinois – $17,368
 Winchester, Illinois – $17,354
 Loraine, Illinois – $17,333
 Greenville, Illinois – $17,326
 Wellington, Illinois – $17,324
 Posen, Illinois – $17,323
 Lovington, Illinois – $17,311
 Crescent City, Illinois – $17,308
 Hamburg, Illinois – $17,290
 Alto Pass, Illinois – $17,288
 Stronghurst, Illinois – $17,269
 Colona, Illinois – $17,265
 Bushnell, Illinois – $17,263
 Arrowsmith, Illinois – $17,261
 Thomson, Illinois – $17,261
 Fairmont, Illinois – $17,260
 Harvard, Illinois – $17,253
 Elizabeth, Illinois – $17,235
 Biggsville, Illinois – $17,215
 Galesburg, Illinois – $17,214
 Cullom, Illinois – $17,207
 Lincoln, Illinois – $17,207
 Rio, Illinois – $17,181
 Woodson, Illinois – $17,175
 Centralia, Illinois – $17,174
 Mount Olive, Illinois – $17,172
 Galva, Illinois – $17,165
 Byron, Illinois – $17,164
 Leland, Illinois – $17,142
 Lebanon, Illinois – $17,125
 Henderson, Illinois – $17,114
 Stonington, Illinois – $17,094
 Emden, Illinois – $17,082
 Farina, Illinois – $17,068
 Alexis, Illinois – $17,059
 Hartsburg, Illinois – $17,057
 Beckemeyer, Illinois – $17,039
 Redmon, Illinois – $17,020
 Canton, Illinois – $17,012
 Campbell Hill, Illinois – $17,009
 La Moille, Illinois – $17,008
 Kell, Illinois – $17,002
 Carbon Cliff, Illinois – $16,998
 Schram City, Illinois – $16,994
 Oneida, Illinois – $16,991
 Cooksville, Illinois – $16,984
 Chapin, Illinois – $16,972
 Ridgway, Illinois – $16,959
 Forreston, Illinois – $16,958
 Salem, Illinois – $16,954
 Jeisyville, Illinois – $16,947
 Dalton City, Illinois – $16,946
 Xenia, Illinois – $16,944
 Stonefort, Illinois – $16,937
 Gulf Port, Illinois – $16,918
 Latham, Illinois – $16,917
 Davis Junction, Illinois – $16,915
 Mechanicsburg, Illinois – $16,906
 Staunton, Illinois – $16,905
 Rutland, Illinois – $16,892
 Bethany, Illinois – $16,888
 Wyanet, Illinois – $16,888
 Lyndon, Illinois – $16,870
 Pontiac, Illinois – $16,863
 Ridott, Illinois – $16,846
 Manlius, Illinois – $16,842
 Alton, Illinois – $16,817
 Bunker Hill, Illinois – $16,798
 Rossville, Illinois – $16,794
 Fairfield, Illinois – $16,791
 Herrin, Illinois – $16,782
 Havana, Illinois – $16,781
 Silvis, Illinois – $16,764
 Glasford, Illinois – $16,754
 Burnham, Illinois – $16,747
 Basco, Illinois – $16,746
 Papineau, Illinois – $16,730
 Earlville, Illinois – $16,722
 Lawrenceville, Illinois – $16,717
 Anna, Illinois – $16,714
 Creve Coeur, Illinois – $16,712
 Bluffs, Illinois – $16,705
 St. Anne, Illinois – $16,702
 Fairmount, Illinois – $16,691
 Saybrook, Illinois – $16,671
 Carlinville, Illinois – $16,663
 Smithfield, Illinois – $16,661
 Dieterich, Illinois – $16,652
 Chrisman, Illinois – $16,651
 Deer Grove, Illinois – $16,651
 Streator, Illinois – $16,650
 Waynesville, Illinois – $16,640
 Hooppole, Illinois – $16,638
 Watseka, Illinois – $16,638
 Robinson, Illinois – $16,637
 Cerro Gordo, Illinois – $16,635
 Dixon, Illinois – $16,630
 Jewett, Illinois – $16,628
 Pittsfield, Illinois – $16,628
 Iroquois, Illinois – $16,624
 Ridge Farm, Illinois – $16,624
 Chadwick, Illinois – $16,617
 Cuba, Illinois – $16,608
 Farmersville, Illinois – $16,606
 Ursa, Illinois – $16,600
 Sauk Village, Illinois – $16,598
 Troy Grove, Illinois – $16,595
 Allenville, Illinois – $16,586
 Bartelso, Illinois – $16,584
 Wyoming, Illinois – $16,574
 Liberty, Illinois – $16,565
 Kincaid, Illinois – $16,553
 Hoyleton, Illinois – $16,543
 Irvington, Illinois – $16,541
 Virden, Illinois – $16,541
 Rock Falls, Illinois – $16,524
 Golden, Illinois – $16,518
 Villa Grove, Illinois – $16,504
 Goreville, Illinois – $16,491
 Danville, Illinois – $16,476
 Naplate, Illinois – $16,459
 Mount Carroll, Illinois – $16,455
 Brighton, Illinois – $16,453
 London Mills, Illinois – $16,453
 Columbus, Illinois – $16,429
 Assumption, Illinois – $16,421
 Long Point, Illinois – $16,416
 Addieville, Illinois – $16,415
 Flat Rock, Illinois – $16,398
 Mount Carmel, Illinois – $16,391
 Verona, Illinois – $16,387
 Greenfield, Illinois – $16,386
 Melvin, Illinois – $16,383
 Valier, Illinois – $16,366
 Newton, Illinois – $16,363
 Sparta, Illinois – $16,343
 Ferris, Illinois – $16,341
 Carrollton, Illinois – $16,340
 Kinderhook, Illinois – $16,328
 Nokomis, Illinois – $16,328
 Franklin, Illinois – $16,327
 Ava, Illinois – $16,324
 North Henderson, Illinois – $16,292
 Livingston, Illinois – $16,291
 Indianola, Illinois – $16,284
 Brussels, Illinois – $16,281
 Bradford, Illinois – $16,279
 Tilton, Illinois – $16,276
 Steward, Illinois – $16,270
 Mount Vernon, Illinois – $16,268
 Casey, Illinois – $16,266
 DeKalb, Illinois – $16,261
 Avon, Illinois – $16,257
 Junction, Illinois – $16,256
 Gladstone, Illinois – $16,245
 Humboldt, Illinois – $16,244
 Rockbridge, Illinois – $16,243
 Ellisville, Illinois – $16,225
 Roseville, Illinois – $16,225
 Cairo, Illinois – $16,220
 Toulon, Illinois – $16,219
 Olney, Illinois – $16,218
 Martinton, Illinois – $16,208
 Melrose Park, Illinois – $16,206
 Norris, Illinois – $16,205
 Bellflower, Illinois – $16,200
 Dallas City, Illinois – $16,188
 Rushville, Illinois – $16,180
 Ruma, Illinois – $16,176
 Hartford, Illinois – $16,160
 Blue Island, Illinois – $16,156
 Dunfermline, Illinois – $16,152
 Alhambra, Illinois – $16,124
 Strasburg, Illinois – $16,102
 West Brooklyn, Illinois – $16,102
 Brimfield, Illinois – $16,090
 Norwood, Illinois – $16,089
 Tallula, Illinois – $16,088
 Belgium, Illinois – $16,038
 Shumway, Illinois – $16,032
 Batchtown, Illinois – $16,013
 Woodlawn, Illinois – $16,013
 Ipava, Illinois – $16,007
 Windsor, Illinois (Shelby County) – $16,002
 Scales Mound, Illinois – $15,992
 Findlay, Illinois – $15,990
 Urbana, Illinois – $15,969
 Metropolis, Illinois – $15,967
 Oakland, Illinois – $15,964
 Pontoon Beach, Illinois – $15,960
 Varna, Illinois – $15,948
 Sigel, Illinois – $15,933
 Marissa, Illinois – $15,930
 Carmi, Illinois – $15,886
 Nason, Illinois – $15,866
 Annawan, Illinois – $15,839
 Monmouth, Illinois – $15,839
 Hollowayville, Illinois – $15,825
 Malden, Illinois – $15,820
 Chandlerville, Illinois – $15,812
 Altona, Illinois – $15,805
 St. Johns, Illinois – $15,802
 Benton, Illinois – $15,787
 Royalton, Illinois – $15,778
 Hutsonville, Illinois – $15,774
 Mount Sterling, Illinois – $15,755
 Kewanee, Illinois – $15,746
 Harvel, Illinois – $15,740
 South Pekin, Illinois – $15,717
 Abingdon, Illinois – $15,711
 Rock Island Arsenal, Illinois – $15,710
 Marietta, Illinois – $15,662
 Flora, Illinois – $15,653
 Alsey, Illinois – $15,652
 Sheldon, Illinois – $15,627
 Leaf River, Illinois – $15,620
 Lewistown, Illinois – $15,620
 Claremont, Illinois – $15,606
 Pinckneyville, Illinois – $15,601
 Winslow, Illinois – $15,595
 New Boston, Illinois – $15,593
 La Harpe, Illinois – $15,586
 Stewardson, Illinois – $15,586
 East Alton, Illinois – $15,572
 Metcalf, Illinois – $15,568
 Wataga, Illinois – $15,553
 St. Augustine, Illinois – $15,549
 Richview, Illinois – $15,546
 Bluford, Illinois – $15,537
 De Soto, Illinois – $15,526
 Percy, Illinois – $15,524
 Benld, Illinois – $15,521
 Kangley, Illinois – $15,505
 Bureau Junction, Illinois – $15,490
 Kankakee, Illinois – $15,479
 Altamont, Illinois – $15,478
 Caseyville, Illinois – $15,467
 Saunemin, Illinois – $15,439
 Franklin Grove, Illinois – $15,427
 Scott AFB, Illinois – $15,421
 Johnsonville, Illinois – $15,411
 Rosiclare, Illinois – $15,398
 Patoka, Illinois – $15,382
 Sesser, Illinois – $15,378
 Jonesboro, Illinois – $15,372
 Broadlands, Illinois – $15,366
 Old Ripley, Illinois – $15,363
 Colchester, Illinois – $15,354
 McLeansboro, Illinois – $15,354
 Murrayville, Illinois – $15,353
 Hillcrest, Illinois – $15,340
 Buda, Illinois – $15,320
 Clear Lake, Illinois – $15,284
 Sciota, Illinois – $15,280
 Kinmundy, Illinois – $15,279
 De Pue, Illinois – $15,273
 Mendon, Illinois – $15,267
 Bismarck, Illinois – $15,255
 Oquawka, Illinois – $15,254
 Chatsworth, Illinois – $15,241
 Brownstown, Illinois – $15,239
 Augusta, Illinois – $15,237
 Bay View Gardens, Illinois – $15,230
 Belle Rive, Illinois – $15,221
 Camp Point, Illinois – $15,211
 Blandinsville, Illinois – $15,203
 Maquon, Illinois – $15,199
 Potomac, Illinois – $15,197
 St. Peter, Illinois – $15,192
 Palestine, Illinois – $15,185
 West Salem, Illinois – $15,179
 Neoga, Illinois – $15,173
 Owaneco, Illinois – $15,171
 Savanna, Illinois – $15,150
 Christopher, Illinois – $15,141
 Shipman, Illinois – $15,139
 Little York, Illinois – $15,121
 Mulberry Grove, Illinois – $15,105
 Girard, Illinois – $15,090
 Wilsonville, Illinois – $15,089
 Berlin, Illinois – $15,079
 Sidell, Illinois – $15,061
 Hoopeston, Illinois – $15,055
 Oak Grove, Illinois – $15,045
 Nelson, Illinois – $15,043
 Kirkwood, Illinois – $15,040
 Coatsburg, Illinois – $15,026
 Harrisburg, Illinois – $15,005
 La Fayette, Illinois – $15,002
 White Hall, Illinois – $14,982
 Buncombe, Illinois – $14,975
 Hume, Illinois – $14,970
 Chicago Heights, Illinois – $14,963
 Matherville, Illinois – $14,956
 South Roxana, Illinois – $14,938
 Oblong, Illinois – $14,926
 Lynnville, Illinois – $14,919
 Vandalia, Illinois – $14,918
 Ewing, Illinois – $14,917
 Maywood, Illinois – $14,915
 Kingston Mines, Illinois – $14,908
 Pana, Illinois – $14,897
 Keensburg, Illinois – $14,889
 Ashmore, Illinois – $14,886
 Du Quoin, Illinois – $14,883
 Versailles, Illinois – $14,876
 Markham, Illinois – $14,870
 Cabery, Illinois – $14,839
 Crossville, Illinois – $14,835
 New Bedford, Illinois – $14,830
 White City, Illinois – $14,826
 Muncie, Illinois – $14,822
 Witt, Illinois – $14,817
 Odin, Illinois – $14,814
 Fieldon, Illinois – $14,811
 Sumner, Illinois – $14,808
 Bulpitt, Illinois – $14,807
 Palmyra, Illinois – $14,801
 Prairie du Rocher, Illinois – $14,771
 Albion, Illinois – $14,747
 Easton, Illinois – $14,745
 Sandoval, Illinois – $14,739
 Tilden, Illinois – $14,738
 Tovey, Illinois – $14,712
 Woodland, Illinois – $14,707
 Martinsville, Illinois – $14,706
 Golconda, Illinois – $14,698
 Harmon, Illinois – $14,697
 Ashley, Illinois – $14,694
 Calhoun, Illinois – $14,679
 West Frankfort, Illinois – $14,671
 Littleton, Illinois – $14,670
 Wilmington, Illinois – $14,670
 Energy, Illinois – $14,656
 New Douglas, Illinois – $14,617
 New Grand Chain, Illinois – $14,617
 Litchfield, Illinois – $14,612
 Summit, Illinois – $14,611
 Kansas, Illinois – $14,590
 Parkersburg, Illinois – $14,581
 Griggsville, Illinois – $14,578
 Tamaroa, Illinois – $14,573
 Burnt Prairie, Illinois – $14,572
 North Chicago, Illinois – $14,564
 Pocahontas, Illinois – $14,562
 Good Hope, Illinois – $14,555
 Cahokia, Illinois – $14,545
 Payson, Illinois – $14,541
 Ellis Grove, Illinois – $14,527
 Grand Tower, Illinois – $14,525
 Charleston, Illinois – $14,522
 Menominee, Illinois – $14,518
 Raritan, Illinois – $14,484
 Ste. Marie, Illinois – $14,479
 Middletown, Illinois – $14,478
 Tampico, Illinois – $14,467
 Riverdale, Illinois – $14,461
 Pontoosuc, Illinois – $14,453
 Montrose, Illinois – $14,443
 Maeystown, Illinois – $14,432
 Strawn, Illinois – $14,424
 East Cape Girardeau, Illinois – $14,420
 Industry, Illinois – $14,411
 Fillmore, Illinois – $14,363
 Scottville, Illinois – $14,362
 Modesto, Illinois – $14,356
 Mill Shoals, Illinois – $14,355
 Phoenix, Illinois – $14,321
 Grayville, Illinois – $14,318
 Carrier Mills, Illinois – $14,314
 St. David, Illinois – $14,292
 Noble, Illinois – $14,290
 Taylor Springs, Illinois – $14,279
 Georgetown, Illinois – $14,275
 Bellmont, Illinois – $14,263
 Toledo, Illinois – $14,246
 Godley, Illinois – $14,238
 Stoy, Illinois – $14,229
 Bellevue, Illinois – $14,228
 Tower Hill, Illinois – $14,208
 Joy, Illinois – $14,201
 Pittsburg, Illinois – $14,186
 Hettick, Illinois – $14,117
 Junction City, Illinois – $14,114
 Westfield, Illinois – $14,103
 Dover, Illinois – $14,070
 Oconee, Illinois – $14,068
 Lomax, Illinois – $14,066
 St. Elmo, Illinois – $14,048
 Cisne, Illinois – $14,044
 Keyesport, Illinois – $14,028
 Hindsboro, Illinois – $14,014
 Keithsburg, Illinois – $14,008
 Rankin, Illinois – $14,005
 Bonnie, Illinois – $13,998
 Cobden, Illinois – $13,978
 Sparland, Illinois – $13,924
 Magnolia, Illinois – $13,909
 Millington, Illinois – $13,898
 Clayton, Illinois – $13,882
 Radom, Illinois – $13,882
 Ramsey, Illinois – $13,878
 Dahlgren, Illinois – $13,862
 Forest City, Illinois – $13,855
 Cypress, Illinois – $13,849
 Lima, Illinois – $13,825
 Hull, Illinois – $13,821
 Wamac, Illinois – $13,781
 Zeigler, Illinois – $13,781
 Beardstown, Illinois – $13,777
 Clay City, Illinois – $13,776
 Alvin, Illinois – $13,773
 Eldred, Illinois – $13,772
 Colp, Illinois – $13,769
 Coffeen, Illinois – $13,755
 Bryant, Illinois – $13,740
 Manchester, Illinois – $13,728
 Beaverville, Illinois – $13,707
 Plainville, Illinois – $13,700
 Cutler, Illinois – $13,678
 Norris City, Illinois – $13,671
 Donnellson, Illinois – $13,665
 Vienna, Illinois – $13,662
 West Point, Illinois – $13,631
 Onarga, Illinois – $13,623
 Olmsted, Illinois – $13,615
 Murphysboro, Illinois – $13,527
 Lenzburg, Illinois – $13,505
 Creal Springs, Illinois – $13,483
 Macomb, Illinois – $13,470
 Enfield, Illinois – $13,455
 Mount Clare, Illinois – $13,451
 Victoria, Illinois – $13,446
 Sawyerville, Illinois – $13,415
 East Carondelet, Illinois – $13,402
 Mason, Illinois – $13,392
 Muddy, Illinois – $13,384
 North City, Illinois – $13,360
 Dana, Illinois – $13,349
 Carbondale, Illinois – $13,346
 Karnak, Illinois – $13,346
 Vermont, Illinois – $13,333
 Wayne City, Illinois – $13,333
 Thompsonville, Illinois – $13,327
 Simpson, Illinois – $13,325
 Belknap, Illinois – $13,319
 Tennessee, Illinois – $13,311
 Summerfield, Illinois – $13,283
 Bowen, Illinois – $13,241
 Concord, Illinois – $13,212
 Compton, Illinois – $13,205
 Hidalgo, Illinois – $13,167
 Sorento, Illinois – $13,167
 Kampsville, Illinois – $13,158
 Vermilion, Illinois – $13,157
 Elsah, Illinois – $13,154
 Central City, Illinois – $13,151
 Louisville, Illinois – $13,119
 Banner, Illinois – $13,101
 Madison, Illinois – $13,090
 Eddyville, Illinois – $13,084
 Raleigh, Illinois – $13,054
 Baldwin, Illinois – $13,009
 Watson, Illinois – $13,000
 Williamson, Illinois – $12,988
 Eldorado, Illinois – $12,980
 Equality, Illinois – $12,961
 Bridgeport, Illinois – $12,960
 St. Francisville, Illinois – $12,955
 Pulaski, Illinois – $12,946
 Cambria, Illinois – $12,913
 Stone Park, Illinois – $12,887
 Willisville, Illinois – $12,832
 Galatia, Illinois – $12,810
 Ullin, Illinois – $12,789
 Sailor Springs, Illinois – $12,785
 Beecher City, Illinois – $12,779
 Omaha, Illinois – $12,766
 Johnston City, Illinois – $12,764
 Astoria, Illinois – $12,758
 New Burnside, Illinois – $12,709
 Alma, Illinois – $12,693
 Pleasant Hill, Illinois – $12,682
 Kempton, Illinois – $12,641
 Cowden, Illinois – $12,583
 Hurst, Illinois – $12,583
 Springerton, Illinois – $12,568
 Waggoner, Illinois – $12,534
 Cicero, Illinois – $12,489
 Elkville, Illinois – $12,475
 Nebo, Illinois – $12,468
 Dowell, Illinois – $12,464
 Dix, Illinois – $12,463
 Du Bois, Illinois – $12,367
 New Haven, Illinois – $12,367
 Nilwood, Illinois – $12,365
 Edgewood, Illinois – $12,338
 Harvey, Illinois – $12,336
 West City, Illinois – $12,328
 Roodhouse, Illinois – $12,281
 Prairie City, Illinois – $12,269
 Buckner, Illinois – $12,260
 Time, Illinois – $12,253
 Waltonville, Illinois – $12,233
 Ripley, Illinois – $12,210
 Fairmont City, Illinois – $12,203
 Emington, Illinois – $12,183
 Fayetteville, Illinois – $12,163
 Plymouth, Illinois – $12,150
 Arlington, Illinois – $12,148
 Irving, Illinois – $12,144
 Allendale, Illinois – $12,117
 Longview, Illinois – $12,116
 Cave-In-Rock, Illinois – $12,050
 Broughton, Illinois – $11,926
 Dongola, Illinois – $11,917
 Jeffersonville, Illinois – $11,882
 Liverpool, Illinois – $11,848
 Milton, Illinois – $11,847
 Russellville, Illinois – $11,843
 Whiteash, Illinois – $11,780
 Brookport, Illinois – $11,751
 Gorham, Illinois – $11,739
 Dixmoor, Illinois – $11,712
 Sun River Terrace, Illinois – $11,692
 New Canton, Illinois – $11,571
 Iuka, Illinois – $11,520
 Bush, Illinois – $11,503
 Venice, Illinois – $11,483
 Macedonia, Illinois – $11,465
 El Dara, Illinois – $11,422
 Freeman Spur, Illinois – $11,416
 Fults, Illinois – $11,389
 Bardolph, Illinois – $11,361
 Sheridan, Illinois – $11,352
 Kane, Illinois – $11,325
 Thebes, Illinois – $11,262
 Baylis, Illinois – $11,251
 Herrick, Illinois – $11,243
 Glasgow, Illinois – $11,172
 East St. Louis, Illinois – $11,169
 Centreville, Illinois – $11,150
 Tamms, Illinois – $11,131
 Detroit, Illinois – $11,127
 Butler, Illinois – $11,081
 Walshville, Illinois – $11,080
 Medora, Illinois – $11,052
 Mounds, Illinois – $11,035
 Willow Hill, Illinois – $10,926
 Browns, Illinois – $10,922
 Garrett, Illinois – $10,920
 Sims, Illinois – $10,870
 Bone Gap, Illinois – $10,804
 Naples, Illinois – $10,719
 Kilbourne, Illinois – $10,710
 Otterville, Illinois – $10,588
 Mount Erie, Illinois – $10,532
 Smithboro, Illinois – $10,284
 Bath, Illinois – $10,262
 Golden Gate, Illinois – $10,214
 Maunie, Illinois – $10,165
 Royal Lakes, Illinois – $10,049
 Mound City, Illinois – $10,020
 Camden, Illinois – $9,981
 Florence, Illinois – $9,878
 Robbins, Illinois – $9,837
 Bingham, Illinois – $9,780
 Vernon, Illinois – $9,686
 Iola, Illinois – $9,631
 Pearl, Illinois – $9,524
 Wheeler, Illinois – $9,425
 Rockwood, Illinois – $9,387
 Old Shawneetown, Illinois – $9,379
 Bentley, Illinois – $9,269
 Birds, Illinois – $9,216
 Hillview, Illinois – $9,157
 Keenes, Illinois – $9,034
 Walnut Hill, Illinois – $9,025
 Ford Heights, Illinois – $8,938
 Joppa, Illinois – $8,890
 La Prairie, Illinois – $8,844
 Hopkins Park, Illinois – $8,788
 Alorton, Illinois – $8,777
 Orient, Illinois – $8,713
 Ina, Illinois – $8,596
 Vergennes, Illinois – $8,574
 Washington Park, Illinois – $8,495
 Mill Creek, Illinois – $8,317
 Brooklyn, Illinois – $7,944
 Fidelity, Illinois – $7,798
 Valley City, Illinois – $6,833
 Kaskaskia, Illinois – $0
 Ohlman, Illinois

References 

 

United States locations by per capita income

Income
income